Aranmanai is an Indian horror comedy film series directed by Sundar C., Aranmanai (2014), Aranmanai 2 (2016) and Aranmanai 3 (2021). where Sundar C., Hansika , Manobala and Chitra Lakshmanan who appear in the first film, appear in the second film and also appear in third film playing different roles while Andrea Jeremiah, Vinay Rai, Raai Laxmi, Santhanam, Siddharth, Trisha, Poonam Bajwa, Soori, Arya, Raashii Khanna, Vivek, Devananda, Yogi Babu, Sakshi Agarwal playing a lead roles in a respective series. All films were successful at the box office, continuing the trend of the comedy-horror genre in Kollywood that began with Chandramukhi (2005).

Synopsis 
The films are not connected with each other. Each film typically revolves around a Zamindar family at a palace that is haunted by supernatural events.

Films 
Aranmanai (2014): A family returns to their hometown to sell their ancestral palace. However, their arrival is marred by supernatural events, and Ravi, a relative of the family, decides to uncover the truth.
Aranmanai 2 (2016): Murali returns to his ancestral home along with his fiancée when his father lands in a coma under mysterious circumstances. His life takes a turn when he uncovers his family's dark secrets.
Aranmanai 3 (2021): Jyothi is haunted by an unknown spirit in her childhood. Years later, when the spirit starts haunting someone close to her, she decides to unearth the spirit’s connection with her family.
Aranmanai 4 (2023):  Fourth installment of this series Aranmanai 4 is under pre-production working. The film stars Sundar C., Tamannaah, Siddharth, Andrea Jeremiah, Raashii Khanna and Santhanam in prominent roles.

Cast

Aranmanai 
Sundar C. as Ravi
Hansika Motwani as Selvi
Vinay Rai as Murali
Andrea Jeremiah as Madhavi
Raai Laxmi as Maya 
Santhanam as Paalsamy
Kovai Sarala as Eshwari
Manobala as Eshwari's husband
Nithin Sathya as Muliankannan
Meera Krishnan as Murali's mother
Chitra Lakshmanan as Maya's father
Saravanan as Ayyanar
Kota Srinivasa Rao as Swamiji

Aranmanai 2 
Sundar C. as Ravi
Siddarth as Murali
Hansika Motwani as Maya
Trisha as Anitha
Poonam Bajwa as Manju
Soori as Devadas & Sandhu Bondhu Naadimuthu
Kovai Sarala as Komalam
Manobala as Komalam's brother
Vaibhav Reddy as Arun
Radharavi as Ramesh, Murali and Maya's father
Khushbu in Special appearance in the Song "Amman"
Subbu Panchu as Ramesh, Maya's brother
Vinodhini Vaidyanathan as Sandhya, Murali's sister-in-law
Chitra Lakshmanan as  Anitha's father

Aranmanai 3  
Sundar C. as Ravi
Arya as Saravanan
Raashii Khanna as Jyothi
Andrea Jeremiah as Eeshwari (Raani) 
Sakshi Agarwal as Hema
Vivek as Sigamani
Ovi Bhandarkar as Shalu
Nalini as Tik Tok Sarala
Madhusudan Rao as Vallimalai Swamiji
Myna Nandhini as Mynavathi
Veronika Arora as Young Jyothi
Yogi Babu as Abhishek
Sampath Raj as Rajasekhar
Vichu Vishwanath as Kaali
Manobala as Pencil
Amit Bhargav as Eeshwari's lover
Hariharan in a special appearance
Shankar Mahadevan in a special appearance
Vincent Ashokan as Durai
C. Sathya in a Cameo appearance

Aranmanai 4  
Sundar C.
Tamannaah
Siddharth
Andrea Jeremiah
Raashii Khanna
Santhanam
K. Bhagyaraj
Meena
Vichu Vishwanath

Character identification

Home media

References 

Comedy film series
Horror film series
Indian film series